National symbols of Germany are the symbols that are used in Germany to represent what is unique about the nation, reflecting different aspects of its cultural life and history.

Symbols

See also

German cuisine
Music of Germany
German art

References

External links

 Germany symbols and flag and national anthem